The 2013–14 season was the 105th season in Levante’s history and the 9th in the top-tier.

Squad
As June, 2014..

Squad and statistics

	

|}

Transfers

Competitions

Overall

Primera División

League table

Copa del Rey

References

Levante UD seasons
Levante UD